Lamb is the debut studio album by English electronic music duo Lamb. It was released on 30 September 1996 by Fontana Records.

In the United States, Lamb was released in 1997 and distributed by Fontana's parent label Mercury Records. The album was reissued on LP by Music on Vinyl on 10 March 2014.

Track listing

Notes
 On the CD edition of the album, "Cotton Wool" (Fila Brazillia mix) is a hidden track that begins two minutes after the end of "Feela". On the LP edition, it is included in the printed track listing.

Personnel
Credits are adapted from the album's liner notes.

Lamb
 Andy Barlow
 Lou Rhodes

Additional musicians

 The Chainsaw Sisters – cello
 Steve Christian – guitar
 Graham Massey – vibraphone
 Paddy Steer – double bass
 Jon Thorne – double bass

Production

 Ian Cooper – mastering
 Fila Brazillia – remixing on "Cotton Wool" (Fila Brazillia mix)
 Lamb – production, recording
 Aidan Love – mixing on "Gold"
 Ali Staton – mixing, additional recording

Design
 Karen Lamond – photography
 Rick Myers – design

Charts

References

External links
 

1996 debut albums
Lamb (band) albums
Albums recorded in a home studio
Fontana Records albums
Mercury Records albums